La Mante is a French thriller miniseries, that debuted on Netflix on 30 December 2017 after airing on TF1 during September 2017. It was released on Netflix France on 13 October 2017.

Premise
In Paris, police search for a psychopath whose murders are inspired by Jeanne Deber, known as "The Mantis," a famous serial killer who terrorised the country 25 years ago. Jeanne Deber offers her expertise to the police in order to help hunt down the copycat. Placed in solitary confinement since her arrest, "The Mantis" has one condition: to deal only with Detective Damien Carrot, her estranged son. Damien has no choice, for a serial killer is on the loose and could strike anytime, anywhere in Paris.

Cast
 Carole Bouquet as Jeanne Deber / The Mantis
 Fred Testot as Damien Carrot
 Jaques Weber as Charles Carrot
 Pascal Demolon as Dominique Feracci
 Manon Azem as Lucie Carrot
 Serge Riaboukine as Crozet
 Robinson Stevenin as Alex Crozet
 Fredérique Bel as Virginie Delorme
 Elodie Navarre as Szofia Kovacs
 Adama Niane as Stern
 Yannick Samot as Bertrand
 Steve Tran as Achille
 Julien Tortora as Gallieni

References 

French-language Netflix original programming
Serial killers in television
2010s French television miniseries
2017 French television series debuts
2017 French television series endings